Madadhan is an Irish name commonly anglicised as Madden and Madigan. Whilst originally a forename, it also became the surname Ó Madadhan, meaning "descendant of Madden". Notable people with the surname include:

Madden
Eochaid Mugmedon (McMadden), High King of Ireland, father of Niall Noi Gallach aka Niall of the Nine Hostages. Ancestor to Uí Néill and Connachta dynasties of Ireland
Madudan mac Gadhra Mór (died 1008), immediate ancestor of the Madden family in County Galway
Ambrose Madden (disambiguation)
Aoife Madden (born 1981), Irish film producer and actress
Anita Madden (1933–2018), American sportswoman, socialite, and political activist
Anne Madden (artist) (born 1932), Irish painter
Beezie Madden (born 1963), American show jumping competitor
Benji Madden (born 1979), American guitarist and vocalist for the band Good Charlotte
Bill Madden (disambiguation)
Bobby Madden (born 1978), Scottish football referee
Bunny Madden (1882–1954), Major League Baseball player
Cain Madden (born 1996), American football player
Charles Madden (disambiguation)
Chris Madden (designer) (born 1948), American interior designer, television host, author and businesswoman
Chris Madden (ice hockey) (born 1978), American retired professional ice hockey player
Ciaran Madden (born 1942), English actress
Craig Madden (born 1958), English former professional footballer
David Madden (disambiguation)
Deirdre Madden (born 1960), Irish writer
Denis J. Madden (born 1940), American Roman Catholic bishop
Dominic Madden (born 1975), English theatre and venue owner
Donald Madden (1928–1983), American theater, television, and film actor
Ed Madden, American poet and political activist
Edward Madden (1878–1952), American lyricist
Edward Madden (botanist) (1805–1856), Irish-born botanist
Edward M. Madden (1818–1885), New York politician
Eva Anne Madden (1863–1958), American educator, journalist, playwright, author
 Sir Frederic Madden (1801–1873), English palaeographer
Fred H. Madden (born 1954), American politician
George Peter Madden (1887–1977), American lawyer and politician
Jake Madden (1865–1948), Scottish footballer
James Madden (disambiguation)
Joanie Madden, American player of Irish traditional music
Joel Madden (born 1979), American singer, record producer, actor, disc jockey, UNICEF Goodwill Ambassador
John Madden (1936–2021), American football coach and sportscaster; namesake of the Madden NFL video game series
John Madden (disambiguation), several other people
Justin Madden (born 1961), former Australian rules footballer and politician
Kathleen Madden, American mathematician
Kevin Madden (born 1972), American public relations professional
Lawrie Madden (born 1955), English former professional footballer
Liam Madden, former United States Marine, a leader of Iraq Veterans Against the War
Mark Madden (born 1960), American journalist and broadcaster
Martin B. Madden (1855–1928), US Congressman, promoted the Madden Dam for the Panama Canal
Matt Madden (born 1968), American comic book writer and artist
Max Madden (born 1941), British journalist and Labour Party politician
Michael Madden (disambiguation)
Niall Madden (born 1985), Irish jockey
Owen Madden (disambiguation)
Owney Madden (1891–1965), American gangster, night club manager and boxing promoter
Paddy Madden (born 1990), Irish footballer
Paul Madden (disambiguation)
Peter Madden (disambiguation)
Rashad Madden (born 1992), American basketball player in the Israeli National League
Ray Madden (1892–1987), United States Representative from Indiana
Richard Robert Madden (1798–1886), Irish physician and historian
Richard Madden (born 1986), Scottish stage, film and television actor
Samuel Madden (1686–1765), Irish author
Samuel Madden (MIT) (born 1976), American computer scientist
Simon Madden (born 1957), former Australian rules footballer
Simon Madden (Irish footballer) (born 1988)
Sinéad Madden, Irish singer-songwriter and fiddle player
Stacey Madden (born 1982), Canadian writer
Steve Madden (born 1958), founder and former CEO of eponymous footwear company
Tamara Natalie Madden, Jamaican-American painter and mixed-media artist
Thomas Madden (disambiguation)
Timothy Madden, Massachusetts politician
J. Warren Madden (1890–1972), American lawyer, judge, civil servant, and educator

Ó Madadhan
Ambrose Ó Madadhan, first Prior of Portumna Priory
Anmchadh Ó Madadhan, Chief of the Name, died 1636
Breasal Ó Madadhan, Lord of Síol Anmchadha and Chief of the Name, died 1526
Cathal Ó Madadhan (died 1286), King of Síol Anmchadha
Diarmaid Cleirech Ua Madadhan (died 1207), King of Síol Anmchadha
Diarmaid Ua Madadhan (died 1135), King of Síol Anmchadha and Uí Maine
Domhnall Ó Madadhan, chief of Síol Anmchadha, fl. 1567 – after 8 March 1611
Eoghan Carrach Ó Madadhan, Chief of Síol Anmchadha, fl. 1451
Eoghan Mór Ó Madadhan, Chief of Síol Anmchadha, fl. 1371–1410
Eoghan Ó Madadhan, Chief of Síol Anmchadha, fl. 1314–1347
John Ó Madadhan, Lord of Síol Anmchadha and Chief of the Name, died 1556
Madudan Mór Ua Madadhan, King of Síol Anmchadha, died after 1158
Madudan Óg Ó Madadhan (died 1235), King of Síol Anmchadha
Madudan Reamhar Ua Madadhan, Chief of Síol Anmchadha, 1069–1095
Melaghlin Ua Madadhan (died 1188), King of Síol Anmchadha
Murcadh Ó Madadhan, Chief of Síol Anmchadha, died 1451
Murchadh Ó Madadhan, King of Síol Anmchadha, died 1327
Murchadh Reagh Ó Madadhan, Chief of Síol Anmchadha, died 1475
Owen Ó Madadhan, Lord of Síol Anmchadha and Chief of the Name, fl. 1475
Richard Ó Madadhan, Prior of Portumna Priory in 1691

See also
Maddin, surname

Surnames of Irish origin
Irish-language surnames